Baroness Wolfardine Auguste Luise von Minutoli (1 February 1794 -  22 November 1864) was a German writer and Egyptologist.

Early life 
Countess Wolfardine August Luise von der Schulenburg was born in Dessau, as the youngest child and only daughter Count Adolph Friedrich Werner von der Schulenburg (1759–1825) und his wife, Wolfardine von Kampen (1773–1794).

Biography 
In September 1820 Wolfardine arrived, along with her husband Heinrich Menu von Minutoli and other scholars, in Alexandria as part of a research expedition to Egypt. Wolfardine published an account of her travels, first in French in 1826 as Mes souvenirs d’Egypte and subsequently in English (1827) and German (1829).This is one of very few travel accounts written by German women at this time. In it she demonstrates her classical education by quoting Strabo, Pliny the Elder, and Pausanias throughout it.

Wolfardine and Heinrich had three sons, Julius, Adolph and Alexander.

Select publications
von Minutoli, W. 1827. Recollections of Egypt . Philadelphia.

References

1794 births
1864 deaths
Women classical scholars
German Egyptologists
People from Dessau-Roßlau
German travel writers
Women travel writers
German baronesses
Swiss nobility
Wolfardine
Schulenburg family